El valle de los miserables (English: The valley of the miserable) is a 1975 Mexican drama film. Based in the novel El Valle Nacional by Enrique Albuerne.

Synopsis  
In 1909, the former Judge Cristobal Zamarripa Zamarripa is the owner of the Valle Nacional, the a plantation where snuff exploits workers, supported by the tyrant Porfirio Díaz, who sends political prisoners as slaves. Others are engaged with the promise of high wages, but end up owing all to the company store. All are tortured, raped or killed when they protest. Another rancher (whose brother was killed by Zamarripa), will be punished, but flees and becomes revolutionary. The Zamarripa minions betray each other and they flee of the revolutionaries, led by fugitive landowner. The prisoners, upon release, massacred all the Zamarripa family.

Cast 
 Mario Almada ... Don Cristobal Zamarripa
 Ana Luisa Peluffo ... Concepción Zamarripa
 Silvia Mariscal ... Margarita Zamarripa
 Alma Muriel ... Marina Guzmán
 Fernando Almada ... Verduguillo
 Ricardo Carrión ... Dr. Felipe Álvarez
 Marianne Sauvage ... Lydia Zamarripa
 Hugo Stiglitz ... Felipe Aguirre
 Jorge Russek ... Pancracio
 René Cardona ... Don Luis Aguirre
 Roberto "Flaco" Guzmán ... Chico
 Guillermo Álvarez Bianchi ... Don Casimiro
 José Carlos Ruiz ... Tío Chinto
 Famie Kauffmann "Vitola" ... Doña Vírgen
 Farnesio de Bernal ... Sacerdote
 Juan Jose Martínez Casado ... Don Crispín

References

External links 
 
 FilmAffinity: El valle de los miserables
 Cine Mexicano de Galletas: El valle de los miserables

1975 films
1970s Spanish-language films
1975 drama films
Mexican drama films
1970s Mexican films